Middlebrook is a surname. Notable people with the surname include:

 Diane Middlebrook (1939–2007), American biographer, poet and teacher
 James Middlebrook (born 1977), English cricketer
 Jason Middlebrook (born 1975), American baseball pitcher
 Lindsay Middlebrook (born 1955), Canadian ice hockey goaltender
 Martin Middlebrook (born 1932), British military historian and Fellow of the Royal Historical Society
 R. D. Middlebrook (1929–2010), early pioneer of power electronics
 William Middlebrook, 1st Baronet (1851–1936), English solicitor and Liberal Party politician
 Willie Middlebrook (1858–1919), English cricketer
 Willie Middlebrook (artist) (1957–2012), African-American photographer, artist and advocate

See also
 Middlebrooks, surname
 Middlebrook (disambiguation)

fr:Middlebrook